Bregtje Grietje "Betty" de Boer (born 2 September 1971 in Surhuisterveen) is a Dutch politician and former management consultant and civil servant. As a member of the People's Party for Freedom and Democracy (Volkspartij voor Vrijheid en Democratie) she was an MP between 17 June 2010 and 23 March 2017. She focused on matters of housing.

Biography 
De Boer completed secondary school in Drachten and studied legal administration at the University of Groningen. She then worked for various municipalities and companies. In 2004 she started her own consultancy firm, aimed at SMEs and government.

In 2002 De Boer was elected a councilor for the VVD in the city council of the city of Groningen. She focused on spatial planning and traffic and transport. In 2006 she succeeded Remco Kouwenhoven as party leader. De Boer was a member of the council committees for Finance & Security and Spatial Planning & Housing. She was also a member of the audit committee.

On 9 June 2010, De Boer was elected a member of the House of Representatives. She was spokeswoman for railways, public transport, sea and inland shipping and ports in the House. In 2010 she was in 10th place on the electoral list; in 2012 in place 11. In 2017 she was not on the list of candidates.

Since 1 September 2017, De Boer has been working as a relationship manager at the Maggie's Center in Groningen. She has also been interim director of the Groningen-Assen Region since 1 September 2018.

Furthermore, De Boer is treasurer of the board of the Bunno Mezclado Foundation, chairman of the supervisory board of the Stichting Omroep Organisatie Groningen, chairman of the supervisory board of the Building Foundation and chairman of the South Western Quarter Area Committee.

References

External links 
  Betty de Boer personal website
  House of Representatives biography
  People's Party for Freedom and Democracy biography

1971 births
Living people
Dutch civil servants
Dutch management consultants
Members of the House of Representatives (Netherlands)
Municipal councillors of Groningen (city)
People from Achtkarspelen
People's Party for Freedom and Democracy politicians
University of Groningen alumni
21st-century Dutch politicians
21st-century Dutch women politicians